Imago Theatre is a professional feminist theatre company based in Tiohtià:ke/Montreal, Quebec, Canada.  The company was founded in 1987 by Andres Hausmann, Ray Tomalty, and Kelly Patterson, and is now led by the current Artistic and Executive Director, Krista Jackson. Imago Theatre is a catalyst for conversation, an advocate for gender inclusion and a space that centres feminist values and artistic practices.

Programming 
Imago Theatre's work is committed to pushing boundaries, expanding form, and engaging in essential dialogue about urgent social issues. The company centres feminist values, perspectives, and artistic practices within diverse stories, voices, and experiences. The company’s core values are reflected through productions, festivals and readings; the ARTISTA free mentorship program for young women and people of marginalized genders; artistic residencies; post-show talkbacks; socially engaged community outreach and events; workshop series; and the Pay-What-You-Decide initiative. An artist-driven organization, Imago values radical artistic practice, impactful and challenging dialogue, equity, mentorship, and social change.

Productions 
Imago has presented a varied repertory. Its early days included interpretations of plays by Samuel Beckett and Harold Pinter, and a collective creation about the invention of the atomic bomb, Incandescent (which played in both French and English). Its 2004 production of Bye Bye Baby by Elyse Gasco moved to the Centaur Theatre for the 2005-06 season and in 2010, it produced Down from Heaven, an apocalyptic play by Colleen Wagner.

Micheline Chevrier directed Champs de Mars: A Story of War (2009), Thinking of Yu by Carole Fréchette, If We Were Birds by Erin Shields, La corneille by Lise Vaillancourt (co-production with UniThéâtre, 2014), random by English playwright debbie tucker green (co-production with Black Theatre Workshop, 2015), and Pig Girl by Colleen Murphy (2016).

In early 2020, Imago produced the Canadian Premiere of The Tropic of X by Latinx playwright Caridad Svich.

In 2021, Imago presented the English Language World Premiere of Okinum by Émilie Monnet (co-production with Onishka, presented by Centaur Theatre as a part of Brave New Looks). It then toured to the National Arts Centre Indigenous Theatre.

ARTISTA 
ARTISTA is a free theatre mentorship program for women and gender-diverse people, ages 16-21. It seeks to achieve collective empowerment through theatrical experimentation. Imago Theatre’s supportive and brave learning environment encourages participants to develop self confidence, artistic vocabulary, and gain a sense of community. In this program, participants are encouraged to tell their own stories and share them with the world. Moreover, they receive mentorship from professional artists (both local and national), contributing to the participants’ independence and confidence. These artists are also able to offer insight into the diverse facets of Montreal and Canadian theatre practice.

The Creators Circle 
The Creators Circle is a hub for theatre artists to workshop their developing projects in an environment of support and solidarity. The plays and artists selected centralize questions of gender, while engaging in radical and daring creation practices.

Accessibility 
Imago Theatre operates on a Pay-What-You-Decide philosophy that is aligned with their belief that theatre should be accessible to all. Through this initiative, the company seeks to democratize access to theatre by eliminating financial barriers that might keep people and communities from engaging with art. Imago is also committed to producing work in spaces that are physically accessible, ensuring the buildings are equipped with elevators and ramps if needed.

Imago has also started providing special ASL interpreted performances, French language sur-titling and engaging in digital productions adapted for the Blind.

History 
Under the leadership of Andres Haussman, Imago presented intricately intense international works and electrically experimental yet socially significant bilingual collective creations. The artistry and interactions of both languages were the foundation of the collaboration between Francophone and Anglophone artists, and a reflection of the complex relationship between Montreal’s two solitudes.

In the year 2000, Clare Shapiro took over as Artistic Director. With Schapiro’s unique imagination illuminating the path, Imago’s programming shifted focus to presenting Canadian and Quebecois playwrights, such as Greg Kramer, and stories centered around women’s lived experiences.

In 2013, Micheline Chevrier became Artistic and Executive Director of Imago. Under Chevrier’s leadership, Imago officially became a feminist and artist-run theatre company. Its work examined questions about human nature, climate change, politics, power dynamics, and the treatment of women and marginalized groups in our society.

References

External Links 

 Official Website
 Imago Theatre in the Canadian Theatre Encyclopedia 

Theatre companies in Quebec
Theatre in Montreal
Quebec Anglophone culture in Montreal
Feminist theatre
Theatre in Canada